Ahmad Hegazi (or Ahmed Hejazi), (18 June 1935 – 15 June 2002) was an Egyptian actor whose best known movie was "Night of Counting the Years" (Al-Mummia).

Filmography 
 1990 - Alexandria Again and Forever
 1981 - Sphinx
 1976 - Casimir the Great ...... Tatars' Commander
 1974 - In Desert and Wilderness (miniseries) ..... Gebhr
 1973 - In Desert and Wilderness ..... Gebhr
 1969 - The Night of Counting the Years ..... Ayub

References

External links
 

20th-century Egyptian male actors
1935 births
2002 deaths
Egyptian male film actors